Sipayi Ramu is 1972 Indian Kannada language film directed by Y. R. Swamy, based on the novel Barale Innu Yamune? by Nuggehalli Pankaja. It stars Rajkumar, Leelavathi and Aarathi. The supporting cast includes K. S. Ashwath, Shivaram, Vajramuni and Thoogudeepa Srinivas. At the 1971-72 Karnataka State Film Awards, the film was awarded the Third Best Film and Best Actress (Leelavathi).

The 2012 Hindi movie Paan Singh Tomar, based on the life of Indian soldier turned dacoit Paan Singh Tomar had a similar story line. This was also the first Kannada colour movie which was based on a novel.

Cast 
 Rajkumar as Ramu alias Ram Singh
 Leelavathi as Yamuna
 Aarathi as Champa
 K. S. Ashwath as Hari Singh
 Shivaram as Lakhan Singh
 Vajramuni as Sudhakar
 Thoogudeepa Srinivas as Mangal Singh
 Shakti Prasad as Shetty
 Y. R. Ashwath Narayana
 B. Jaya
 M. Jayashree as Janaki
Debashree Roy

Soundtrack
The music of the film was composed by Upendra Kumar, with lyrics penned by R. N. Jayagopal.

References

External links 
 

1972 films
1970s Kannada-language films
Films directed by Y. R. Swamy
Films scored by Upendra Kumar